Swarthmore High School was a four-year public high school in Swarthmore, Pennsylvania serving the Boroughs of Swarthmore and Rutledge.

History
Swarthmore established its own independent school district when Swarthmore Borough incorporated in 1893.

Families in Springfield Township could choose to send their children to Swarthmore High, Lansdowne High School, and/or Media High School prior to the 1931 establishment of Springfield High School.

The Swarthmore and Rutledge School Districts merged in 1955.  In 1971 the Swarthmore-Rutledge District merged with adjacent Nether Providence School District to create the Wallingford-Swarthmore School District.

After Pennsylvania state officials determined that Swarthmore was too small for its own secondary schools, Swarthmore High School merged with Nether Providence High School in Wallingford to form Strath Haven High School in the fall of 1983. The merged school was and still is based at the former Nether Providence campus.

The building that was Swarthmore High School is now the Swarthmore Rutledge School, an elementary school in the Wallingford-Swarthmore School District.

Notable alumni
Edmund N. Bacon ('28), city planner (and father of actor Kevin Bacon)
Ron Bloom ('73), Presidential advisor in the Obama administration
Wally Butterworth ('18?), radio personality
Carl Gersbach ('64), National Football League player, 1970–1976
Terry Irving ('69), CNN Producer
Edmund Jones ('35), Pennsylvania State Representative
Bevan Sharpless ('22), planetary astronomer
Kim Maslin-Kammerdeiner ('83), Goaltender, 1991 US Women's World Cup Champion Soccer Team
Jan Westcott ('30), author

Further reading

References

Educational institutions established in 1893
Educational institutions disestablished in 1984
Schools in Delaware County, Pennsylvania
Defunct schools in Pennsylvania
1893 establishments in Pennsylvania
Swarthmore, Pennsylvania